Celie or Célie may refer to:

People
Pieter Celie (born 1942), Dutch artist

Fiction
Celie, character in The Color Purple
Célie, character in Signor Deluso by Thomas Pasatieri

See also
Celia (given name)
Celi (disambiguation)